Almirante Lynch was a destroyer in service with the Chilean Navy through World War I and World War II. She was named after Admiral Patricio Lynch, Chilean sailor, hero of the War of the Pacific.

The Chilean Navy ordered six ships from J. Samuel White in 1911. These destroyers were larger and more powerful that contemporary British destroyers. Almirante Lynch was built by the United Kingdom as part of a six ship class of  destroyers, of which only two were delivered before the outbreak of war, and served in the Chilean Navy until 1945.

Almirante Lynch-class destroyers (1912)
Ships built on the Isle of Wight
1912 ships